CGnet Swara is an Indian voice-based online portal that allows people in the forests of Chhattisgarh to report local news in Gondi by making a phone call. The portal is freely accessible via mobile phone or online. It allows anyone to report stories and listen to them by giving a missed call. Reported stories are moderated by journalists and become available for playback online as well as over the phone. It is founded by journalist, Shubhranshu Choudhary. For the project, Choudhary won the Digital Activism Award in 2014 from the Index on Censorship beating Edward Snowden and China's Free Weibo.

History 
Choudhary was a journalist with the BBC World Service. He left his job and joined the Knight International Journalism Fellowship. He took help from Microsoft Principal Researcher Bill Thies to develop a cell phone based news and current affairs portal. He launched CGNet Swara with the help of Microsoft Research India in 2010. He trained people in the local community to produce audio news reports using their cell phone. Reports on local land issues, sanitation, health, crime and human rights were made using the service.

How it works 
Reporters recorded their news reports using an Interactive Voice Response (IVR) system. They recorded their message by calling a toll-free number. A group of professional journalists review and verify the news reports using a web interface. Once they are approved the stories are available for playback on the phone or on the CGNet Swara's website.

In 2014, with the advent of the low cost cell phones, an Android application was developed by Krittika D'Silva, then a student at the University of Washington. The application supported an interactive voice forum where users could record and play messages. The application also supported the ability to upload photos.

References

External links
CGnet Swara

Indian news websites
Web portals
Internet in India
Science and technology in Chhattisgarh